A smoothie is a beverage made by puréeing ingredients in a blender. A smoothie commonly has a liquid base, such as fruit juice or milk, yogurt or ice cream. Other ingredients may be added, including fruits, vegetables, non-dairy milk, crushed ice, whey powder or nutritional supplements. A smoothie without fruit is, in fact, not a smoothie.

History 
Health food stores on the West Coast of the United States began selling smoothies in the 1930s associated with invention of the electric blender. The actual term "smoothie" was being used in recipes and trademarks by the mid-1980s.  In the 1960s Steve Kuhnau was inspired by his work as a soda jerk and began experimenting with smoothies. They were an alternative for the lactose intolerant Kuhnau to taste his own concoctions using unique blends of fruit juices, vegetables, protein powder, and vitamins. Kuhnau discovered early success in his smoothie sales and founded Smoothie King. Smoothie King expanded throughout the United States and would pioneer other smoothie businesses such as Jamba Juice. The smoothie was then modified by fast food chains with the addition of sweeter ingredients like chocolate and Splenda. In the 2000s, the smoothie was made at home as an alternative for daily consumption of fruits and vegetables.

Nutrition

The nutrition of a smoothie depends on its ingredients and their proportions. Many smoothies include large or multiple servings of fruits and vegetables, which are recommended in a healthy diet and intended to be a meal replacement. However, fruit juice containing high amounts of sugar can increase caloric intake and promote weight gain. Ingredients such as protein powders, sweeteners, or ice cream may be used. One study found smoothies to be less satiating, despite providing the same amount of energy as unblended foods.

Types of smoothies

Green smoothie 
A green smoothie typically consists of 40–50% green vegetables (roughly half), usually raw green leafy vegetables, such as spinach, kale, Swiss chard, collard greens, celery, parsley, or broccoli, with the remaining ingredients being mostly or entirely fruit. Most green leafy vegetables have a bitter flavor when served raw, but this can be ameliorated by choosing certain less-bitter vegetables (e.g. baby spinach) or combining with fruits or other sweet ingredients.

Protein smoothie 
A protein smoothie is a combination of water or some form of dairy product, protein powder, fruits, and vegetables. They can be consumed any part of the day and are used as protein supplement for those who want to increase their protein intake. Protein powder can have a chalky taste when mixed individually by itself with milk or water. The protein smoothie improves the taste of the protein powder through addition of fruits or other sweeteners.

Yogurt smoothie 
Greek yogurt smoothies are exceptionally good to provide numerous health benefits, including weight management, strengthening of bones and muscles, and boosting metabolism. Moreover, yogurt smoothies are also an incredible source of probiotics and healthy nutrients to boost body immunity. You can use nuts, seeds, fresh or frozen fruits, almond milk as well as protein powders along with yogurt to enhance the nutrition of drink.

Around the world

Many different smoothies are part of Indian, Mediterranean, and Middle Eastern cuisine. Fruit sharbat (a popular West and South Asian drink) sometimes include yogurt and honey, too. In India, the lassi is a smoothie or milkshake comprising crushed ice, yogurt, sugar, and mango; in the south, pineapple smoothies made with crushed ice, sugar and no yogurt are common.

See also

 Ayran
 Chaas
 Doogh
 Gazpacho
 Health shake
 Kumis
 Lassi
 List of beverages
 List of dairy products
 List of fruit dishes
 List of yogurt-based dishes and beverages
 Milkshake

References

External links

 

Articles containing video clips
Juice
Non-alcoholic mixed drinks
Mediterranean cuisine
Middle Eastern cuisine
Indian drinks
Yogurt-based drinks